Kurkimäki (Finnish), Tranbacka (Swedish) is an eastern neighborhood of Helsinki, Finland.

Politics
Results of the 2011 Finnish parliamentary election in Kurkimäki:

Social Democratic Party   26.4%
True Finns   22.7%
Left Alliance   13.5%
National Coalition Party   13.5%
Green League   10.9%
Centre Party   3.8%
Christian Democrats   2.3%
Swedish People's Party   2.2%

Neighbourhoods of Helsinki